William Preston may refer to:

William Preston (actor) (1921–1998)
William Preston (Freemason) (1742–1818), Scottish author of Illustrations of Masonry
William Preston (Kentucky soldier) (1816–1887), U.S. politician, ambassador, and Confederate officer
William Preston (poet) (1753–1807), Irish poet
William Preston (Virginia soldier) (1729–1783), Irish-born frontier Virginia leader, signer of the Fincastle Resolutions
William Preston (Royal Navy officer), captain in the British Royal Navy who, along with James Stirling, was responsible for the foundations of Perth and Fremantle in Western Australia
William Preston (British politician) (1874–1941), Conservative M.P. for Walsall, 1924–1929
William Alfred Preston (1848–1944), MPP in Ontario, Canada
William B. Preston (Mormon) (1830–1908), Presiding Bishop of the Church of Jesus Christ of Latter-day Saints, 1884–1907
William Ballard Preston (1805–1862), U.S. politician from Virginia
William C. Preston (1794–1860), U.S. politician from Pennsylvania who was a U.S. senator for South Carolina
William G. Preston (1842–1910), American architect
William Preston (bishop) (1729–1789), Anglican bishop in Ireland
Billy Preston (1946–2006), American musician
Billy Preston (basketball) (born 1997), American basketball player
Bill Preston (1893–1954), American football tackle

Fictional
 Sergeant William Preston of the Northwest Mounted Police, lead character in the radio and TV series Challenge of the Yukon